Frederick Woodbridge may refer to:

Frederick Woodbridge (cricketer) (1797–1858), English amateur cricketer
Frederick E. Woodbridge (1818–1888), American politician and lawyer from Vermont
Frederick James Eugene Woodbridge (1867-1940), American philosopher and academic
Frederick James Woodbridge (1900–1974), American architect